Hochfeld is a settlement in the Otjozondjupa Region of central Namibia.

References

Populated places in the Otjozondjupa Region